Music Choice (abbreviated as MC) is an American television music service that digitally broadcasts audio-based music channels and video-related content to cable television providers in the United States. Music Choice reaches 65 million households in North America via linear television channels and TV-on-demand services.

Music Choice is distributed nationwide by Xfinity, Spectrum, Cox Communications, Verizon Fios, DirecTV and other smaller cable providers. Similar broadcast music services include DMX, Stingray Music, Sirius XM, and XITE.

History 
Early development
Music Choice (formerly known as Digital Cable Radio) was the first digital audio broadcast service in the world and, under its founder and CEO David Del Beccaro, launched in test markets circa 1987. From its inception as an eight-channel audio service from Motorola's cable group, Music Choice evolved into a multi-platform interactive music network based in New York City that reaches millions of consumers across the country. Music Choice is a partnership owned by a consortium, including Comcast, Charter Communications through its acquisition of Time Warner Cable in May 2016, Cox Communications, EMI Music, Microsoft, Arris International (previously Motorola's cable technologies division), and Sony Corporation of America.

Music Choice launched its first 24-hour interactive music video cable channel, SWRV, in February 2010.

Several of its stations are measured through Mediabase and its playlists are accounted for in weekly airplay charts in addition to traditional radio and Sirius XM plays.

Platforms

Linear audio channels 

Music Choice currently offers over 50 linear channels of various music radio formats through digital cable providers. The number of channels available varies by provider.

Music Choice On Demand 
Music Choice offers free video on demand content, including hundreds of music videos from various recording artists, original programs, and artist features.

TV Everywhere App 
Beginning in July 2008, Music Choice released iOS and Android apps. The app requires login with a participating provider's TV Everywhere authentication credentials to use, and the same access is available on traditional desktop/laptop web browsers.

On-screen information 
Each Music Choice channel is distributed in freeze frame television, with still slides appearing on-screen as the music plays. These slides display banner advertising (the only advertising on the service, as the audio programming airs commercial-free) along with a looping carousel of “Did You Know?” factoids paired with file photos of the artists in question. In the past, the on-screen trivia factoids have been criticized by some as featuring facts that are overtly depressing or deal with death, as a May 2017 HuffPost story cited a number of factoids recalling various illnesses, homicides, and suicides of various musical artists and their close family, friends and partners over an evening of the network's programming. The color coding on the channel can be blue, pink, green or yellow depending on the dayparts. In 2021, these Music Choice channels has a photo slideshow, with still changes the picture appearing on-screen as the music plays.

SWRV 
In February 2010, Music Choice launched SWRV (pronounced 'swerve'), a 24-hour interactive music video cable channel. The network struggled to gain momentum and was eventually rebranded to Music Choice Play on October 15, 2013, then wound down by the start of 2016.

Subscription services
As of the fall of 2021, Music Choice offers several subscription services which are available through the extended Internet-connected services of cable set-top boxes.

Music Choice Karaoke
A home karaoke service providing access to instrumental versions of popular songs sorted into playlists with sing-along lyrics.

Music Choice Relax
A service providing calming instrumentals and soothing nature imagery for the purposes of relaxation.

Music Choice Plus
A service providing immediate access to any song in the Music Choice library, along with playlist creation, device downloads, and song skipping abilities.

Legal issues

Stingray 
In June 2016, Music Choice filed a lawsuit against Stingray over patent infringement. The lawsuit occurred one month following the announcement that Comcast, part owner of Music Choice, had chosen instead to offer Stingray Radio.

Music Choice drew criticism with the lawsuit; Stingray responded:

“Given the significant inroads that Stingray has made in the U.S. market [Comcast expansion] with its industry-changing technology, Stingray believes that Music Choice’s complaint is without merit and primarily motivated by competitive concerns rather than a desire to protect its intellectual property.”

Music Choice's lawsuit against Stingray disputed a number of U.S. Patents pertaining to the on screen formatting of Stingray Digital's music channels. On August 29, 2016, Stingray countersued Music Choice calling the patent lawsuit a "smear campaign".

Music Modernization Act opposition 

In 2018, A2IM CEO Richard James Burgess accused Music Choice of trying to solicit artist and label support to deceive Congress into reducing artists royalties paid by Music Choice. The criticism came as Music Choice publicly opposed the passage of the Music Modernization Act, which ultimately was signed into law on October 11, 2018.

SoundExchange 

On April 10, 2019, SoundExchange filed a lawsuit against Music Choice for underpayment, following an audit of Music Choice's royalty statements.

See also 
Dash Radio
DMX (music service)
Muzak
Sirius XM
Stingray Radio
Xite

References

External links 
Music Choice Official website

Cable radio
Video on demand services
Music television channels
Television channels and stations established in 1987